Ayyagari Sambasiva Rao (popularly known as A. S. Rao) (1914–2003) was an Indian scientist and founder of Electronics Corporation of India Limited (ECIL), Hyderabad, Telangana, India.

He completed his M.Sc in physics from Banaras Hindu University and then Masters in Electrical Engineering from Stanford University.

Awards and honours
Rao represented India at many international conferences on scientific development including UN conferences on peaceful uses of atomic energy. He also served on the editorial and advisory boards of many scientific journals including many international journals of repute.

Recognition of his services to the nation has brought Rao many awards and honours:
Padma Shri Award in 1960,
Shanti Swaroop Bhatnagar Award for Engineering Sciences in 1965,
Doctor of Science degree, honoris causa, from Andhra University in 1969,
Padma Bhushan in 1972,
Fellow of Indian Academy of Sciences in 1974,
FICCI Award for outstanding achievement in Engineering in 1976, *National design Award from Institution of Engineers (India) in 1977,
Outstanding Scientist Award from A.P. Academy of Science in 1988, Prof.
Nayudamma Memorial Gold Medal in 1989.
A.S.Rao Nagar (near ECIL) in Secunderabad was named in his honour
Postal stamp was released on 16 November 2014 on the occasion of his birth centenary.

Legacy
A. S. Rao Nagar is a major suburb of Hyderabad named after Rao. A biography titled The Man with a Vision was written on Rao by his friend D. Mohana Rao.

References

Further reading
http://timesofindia.indiatimes.com/city/hyderabad/A-S-Rao-ECIL-founder-dead/articleshow/262988.cms

1914 births
2003 deaths
Recipients of the Padma Bhushan in science & engineering
Banaras Hindu University alumni
Scientists from Andhra Pradesh
People from West Godavari district
Stanford University alumni
20th-century Indian physicists
Engineers from Andhra Pradesh
Academic staff of Banaras Hindu University
Experimental physicists
Indian electrical engineers
Recipients of the Padma Shri in science & engineering
20th-century Indian engineers
Recipients of the Shanti Swarup Bhatnagar Award in Engineering Science